Carla Jazzar is a Lebanese diplomat. She is Chargé d'Affairs to Brazil and was Chargé d'Affairs to the United States.

In 2005, she appeared on the "Situation Room." In  2006, she briefed Darrell Issa. She attended  Ramadan Iftar celebrations in Washington, D.C. In 2016, she appeared at the Kahlil Gibran Chair Symposium.

References

External links 

Lebanese women ambassadors
Living people
Year of birth missing (living people)
Ambassadors of Lebanon to the United States